The Special Executive is a fictional group of time-traveling mercenaries, appearing in British and American comic books published by Marvel Comics. Created by Alan Moore, David Lloyd and Alan Davis, they first appeared in the pages of Doctor Who Monthly and Captain Britain.

Publication history 
The Special Executive first appeared in Doctor Who Monthly #51 (April 1981), published by the UK arm of Marvel Comics. They were created by Alan Moore and David Lloyd. The group next appeared in The Daredevils #5 (May 1983), also published by Marvel UK; and then became a feature of Marvel UK's Captain Britain (particularly in the "Jaspers' Warp" storyline).

Group history
Centuries before the Special Executive was founded, there was the Technet, another group of time-traveling bounty hunters. Due to time travel though, the Special Executive returned in time and tried to disband the Technet. The Special Executive at this time was led by an unnamed humanoid and members included Cobweb, Zeitgeist, Legion, and several unnamed members possibly including Oxo and the Technet's Numbers. Despite the warnings of Cobweb, the team's precognitive, that his plans would fail, the leader hoped to kill the Technet's leader Gatecrasher and recruit Fascination 300 years before she would join the Special Executive. The plan fails and the Special Executive retreats, while the leader muses that Gatecrasher will cause problems for them in the future.

At least a century later, the Special Executive's leader had died, and several members had been replaced. The new leader was named Wardog and they now worked for the Gallifreyans against the Order of the Black Sun. A member called Viridian the Brainfeeler was killed by the Order and Wardog lost his arm during all this. Ten years later, another member, Millennium, was mind-controlled by the Order against her team and Wardog was forced to kill her. The Special Executive was also responsible for fighting the cat people of Gallifrey. However, when Rassilon ordered a purge of the Womb-born, Wardog and the others fled the planet.

Later, the Special Executive had recruited several members to its line-up, including Lady Burning Fish and Oxo, and went to Earth-616 in the late 20th century to recruit the Technet, now known as the N-men. Cobweb told the N-men that Earth was about to be destroyed and Wardog offered the N-men a place on the team. The N-men accepted and left with the team.

The Special Executive was hired to capture Captain Britain so that he could testify on Saturnyne's behalf in a cosmic trial. Saturnyne was accused of causing the chaos on an alternate world, which was caused by a version of Mad Jim Jaspers. The world was destroyed, including all evidence of Saturnyne's innocence. Captain Britain was enraged by the trial and found it a farce. He fought the Captain Britain Corps and the Special Executive, feeling responsible for him, helped him. Together they freed Saturnyne and returned to Earth-616, home of Captain Britain.

On Earth-616, the team stayed with Captain Britain in Braddock Manor, but Zeitgeist disagreed with Wardog on this course of action; Wardog felt obligated to help Captain Britain, whose world was menaced by another Mad Jim Jaspers. But, Zeitgeist felt that they were mercenaries and had no obligation to anybody. Shortly after, the Fury attacked the manor, as the Wardog led his group to attack the creature. However, Oxo and a future incarnation of Legion died in the battle. In the end, it was Zeitgeist who blinded the Fury long enough for the group to retaliate against it, but the Fury escaped. With his team in ruins, Wardog apologised to Captain Britain and the Special Executive left Earth.

Members
 name unknown, the first leader. He is a humanoid in appearance. Due to Cobweb's predictions, he knew that he would die and be replaced with Wardog within the next 300 years.
 Wardog, the second leader of the Special Executive. A humanoid with a doglike appearance and a cybernetic left arm. Wardog is honourable, a brilliant strategist and a capable fighter. He is the lover of the Time Lady Rema-Du. His cybernetic arm was torn off by The Fury.
 Cobweb, the team's precognitive, is used to a non-linear perception of time. She sometimes doesn't warn her teammates of dangers.  Sometimes it's because she feels that her visions of the future can't be changed.  Other times it's due to perceived personal slights, some of which are, paradoxically, only caused by her not warning the team in the first place. Cobweb was the lover of Legion. 
 Fascination, she has the ability to fly, has superhuman strength and can cause distortions in her opponent's mind, effectively stunning them. She can also teleport and track people over large distances. She is not very intelligent, unable to speak, and functions mostly on instinct. She feeds on emotions of the people around her. The stronger the emotion, the more nutritious it is for her. Another of Fascination's race, Scatterbrain, was a member of the Technet.  
 Lady Burning Fish appears to be a small, amorphous being on a floating platform. She talked in the form of poems and could generate energy blasts. 
 Legion, brother of the Technet's Thug. While his brother only has superhuman strength and durability, Legion also had the ability to create copies of himself, summoned from his own future. Legion was doomed to die when the Fury killed one of his future selfs and indeed he disappeared days later when summoned to battle the Fury. 
Millennium, mind-controlled by the Order of the Black Sun and killed by Wardog.  Millennium had control over time and could age others quickly.
Oxo, an insect-like creature was killed by The Fury. 
Viridian the Brainfeeler, the team's telepath. Killed by the Order of the Black Sun.
Zeitgeist exists outside of time and space, making him intangible and undetectable to most opponents. When he passes through living beings while intangible, he can cause them great pain. Zeitgeist can also reform his body when damaged.  Often has disagreements with Wardog and his Code of Honour.  He puts getting paid over anything else.

Unconfirmed members
 Numbers: The Technet's accountant and negotiator. A creature who looks exactly like him is with the first Special Executive, but he is never named, nor does he speak or act.
 Ringtoss: Another Technet member. Ringtoss has the ability to fire energy rings that constrict and capture an opponent as well as concussive energy blasts from his head. The creature seen with the Special Executive looks exactly like Ringtoss, but he is not named, and he does not act.

Most other members of the Technet, while they were N-men, were hired by the Special Executive as well, but they have never been seen on a mission as Special Executive. The Special Executive also had several unnamed members, who mostly appeared for a few panels during the recruitment scene of the N-men or in the story before Wardog was leader.

Notes
 Wardog, Cobweb, Zeitgeist and Fascination were born on Gallifrey. During one of Rassilon's experiments with the first Looms, they were imbued with time energies, giving them powers and appearances unlike those of the Gallifreyan Time Lords.
 Despite the Technet being centuries older, the Special Executive appeared first in comics and Captain Britain met the Special Executive before he met the Technet.

References

 The Special Executive at the Unofficial Appendix to Marvel Universe Handbook
 The Special Executive at the International Catalogue of Superheroes

Fictional mercenaries in comics
Doctor Who comic strip characters
Marvel UK teams
Doctor Who organisations
Characters created by Alan Moore